Paul Hankar (11 December 1859 – 17 January 1901) was a Belgian architect and furniture designer, and an innovator in the Art Nouveau style.

Career
Hankar was born at Frameries, in Hainaut, Belgium, the son of a stonemason. He studied at the Royal Academy of Fine Arts in Brussels, where he met fellow student (and future architect) Victor Horta. Like Horta, he closely studied the techniques of forged iron, which he would later use in many of his buildings. He began his career as a designer and sculptor of funeral monuments. From 1879 to 1904, he worked in the studio of the prominent architect Henri Beyaert, a master of eclectic and neoclassical architecture. Through Beyaert, Hankar became an admirer of Eugène Viollet-le-Duc, the French architect who advocated the use of innovative new materials such as iron and glass, while drawing from historical architecture for inspiration. Under Beyaert, he was chief designer for the Palacio de Chávarri (1889) in Bilbao, Spain, constructed for the businessman Víctor Chávarri.

He opened his own office in Brussels in 1893, and began construction of his own house, the Hankar House, at 71, /, in the Saint-Gilles municipality of Brussels. This and Victor Horta's Hôtel Tassel (constructed at the same time), are considered the first two houses built in the Art Nouveau style. A circa-1894 poster by his friend and frequent collaborator, Adolphe Crespin, advertises Hankar's practice there. The Hankar House's facade expresses the building's structure—the eastern third, containing the entrance and stairs, is offset a half-story from the western two-thirds, containing the public rooms. A three-story projecting box-bay, supported on stone corbels, provides ample light to the second and third floor rooms and a balcony for the fourth. Mural panels by Crespin appear under the windows and in an arcaded frieze at the eaves. The interplay between heavy neo-Renaissance elements and materials versus light Art Nouveau detailing and decoration results in a vivid composition.

In 1896, he presented a project for a Cité des Artistes ("City of Artists") for the seaside town of Westende, in West Flanders, Belgium, an artists' cooperative with housing and studios. Although the project never was realized, it would later inspire the Darmstadt Artists' Colony in Darmstadt, Germany, and the artists of the Vienna Secession. For the 1897 World's Fair in Brussels, he contributed to the design of the Congo section, which became known for its full employment of the Art Nouveau. He also lectured on "New Brussels," his vision for an urban redevelopment of the city, that was never realized. Later that year, he participated in the Colonial Exposition in Tervuren, near Brussels, where he coordinated the works of several artisans and furniture designers.

He designed a monumental stone bench (1898–99), carved by the Ecausines and Soignies quarries, to be exhibited in the Mine and Metallurgy Section of the Exposition Universelle (1900) in Paris. King Leopold II of Belgium bought the bench at the close of the exposition, and donated it to a park in the Koninginlaan neighborhood of Ostend, where it was installed by 1905. The bench was removed in 1971 to expand a parking lot, and destroyed. Using Hankar's surviving drawings, a replica bench was carved for the park (2003–04), and installed on the same foundations as the original.

During his career, he was a professor of engineering at the School of Applied Arts in Schaerbeek (1891–97), and a professor of architectural history at the Institut des Hautes Etudes of the University of Brussels (1897–1901). He worked as editor of L'Emulation (1894–96), a magazine that promoted the Art Nouveau style.

He died in January 1901 at the age of 41, when his work was just becoming known, but his style influenced the work of younger Brussels' artists, including Paul Hamesse, Léon Sneyers, Antoine Pompe and the modernist Victor Bourgeois.

Hankar and Horta
The first Art Nouveau houses of Hankar and Horta were completed in the same year, 1893, and the styles of the two architects were similar in several ways. They both renounced traditional historical styles, made visible use of new materials, such as glass and iron, and had as well a strong preference for arches, and for curving lines, a style sometimes called à membrures, which characterised the early work of both architects. There was a great difference, however, in their available budgets; Hankar was building homes for his artist friends, with modest budgets, while Horta had very wealthy patrons, who could afford expensive materials and larger houses. The chief feature  of Horta's houses was the interior, while the focus of Hankar's houses was primarily the facade. Hankar believed that Horta's work was excessively lavish; he called it "Louis XV".

Selected works

Buildings

 Mausoleum of Charles Rogier, Saint-Josse-ten-Noode Cemetery, Brussels (1870s).
 Palacio de Chávarri, Plaza Moyúa, Bilbao, Spain (1888–89). Designed while Hankar worked in Hendrik Beyaert's office.
 Atelier Alfred Crick (Studio of Alfred Crick), 64 Rue Simonis, Elsene, Brussels (1891).
 Jan van Beers Monument (1891), Antwerp.
 Maison Hankar, 71 Rue Defacqz, Brussels (1893).
 Maisons Jaspar, 76, 78 & 80 Rue de la Croix de Pierre, Brussels (1894).
 Maisons Hanssens, 13 & 15 Avenue Edouard Ducpétiaux, Brussels (1894).
 Maison Zegers-Regnard, 83 Chaussée de Charleroi, Brussels (1894–95).
 47 Avenue Edouard Ducpétiaux, Brussels (1895).
 Chemiserie Niguet, 13 Rue Royale, Brussels (1896).
 Maison and Pharmacy Peeters, 6-8 Rue Lebeau, Brussels (1896).
 Boulangerie Timmermans, 551 Rue De Herve, Liège (1896, demolished). The three-story façade was covered by murals by Adolphe Crespin.
 Hôtel Renkin, Brussels (1897, demolished).
 Hôtel Albert Ciamberlani, 48 Rue Defacqz, Brussels (1897).
 Sanatorium (1897), Kraainem.
 Hôtel Janssens, 50 Rue Defacqz, Brussels (1898). 
 Hôtel Kleyer, 25 Rue de Ruysbroeck, Brussels (1898).
 Maison Aglave, 7 Rue Antoine Bréart, Brussels (1898).
 Maison Bartholomé and its Studio, Brussels (1898, demolished).
 Jean-François Willems Monument, Place Saint-Bavon, Ghent (1899), Isidore De Rudder, sculptor. Hankar designed the pedestal.
 Monumental stone bench – exhibited at the Exposition Universelle (1900) in Paris – (1898–99, demolished 1971). Replica stone bench, Koninginlaan Park, Ostend (2003–04).

Furniture & interiors
 Stool (ca. 1893), Design Museum, Ghent.
 Chair (1896), Royal Museums of Art and History, Brussels. Exhibited at the 1897 Exposition Internationale de Bruxelles.
 Mailbox (1897), Nelson-Atkins Museum of Art, Kansas City, Missouri.
 Coffee table from Hôtel Renkin (1897), Design Museum, Ghent.
 Dining table from Hôtel Ciamberlani (1897), Musée d'Orsay, Paris.
 Sideboard from Hôtel Ciamberlani (1897).
 Card table from Hôtel Ciamberlani (1897).
 Side chair from Hôtel Ciamberlani (1897).
 Swivel chair (ca. 1897). 
 Chair with woven leather back (ca. 1897). 
 Mahogany dining table (ca. 1897), Galerie Yves Macaux (March 2015).
 Furniture and interiors, American Bar and Grill-Room (1897–98), Grand Hôtel de Bruxelles.
 Pair of folding screens – sold at Christie's Auctions, London, 3 November 2004 – Galerie Yves Macaux (March 2015).
 Tabouret (stool) – sold at Phillips Auctions, New York, 15 December 2010.
 Stool from Compagnie Générale des Céramiques d'Architecture (1898), Los Angeles County Museum of Art, Los Angeles, California. 
 An identical stool is at Galerie Yves Macaux (March 2015).
 Chair (year), Cinquantenaire Museum, Brussels.

See also

 Art Nouveau in Brussels

References

Notes

Bibliography

Further reading
 Charles de Maeyer, Paul Hankar, Mertens, Brussels, 1963.
 Francois Loyer, Paul Hankar: La Naissance de l'Art Nouveau. Archives d'Architecture Modern a Bruxelles. 1986. 
 Francois Loyer, Paul Hankar, Architecte: Dix Ans d'Art Nouveau / Ten Years of Art Nouveau. Archives d'Architecture Moderne a Bruxelles. 1991. .
 Francois Loyer, et al., Paul Hankar, Architecte d'Intérieur, Fondation Roi Baudouin. 2005. .

1859 births
1901 deaths
Belgian architects
Art Nouveau architects
People from Frameries
Belgian furniture designers
Académie Royale des Beaux-Arts alumni